The Capitol Grounds  Capitol Park (I), was a baseball field in Washington, D.C. The grounds were the home field for the Washington Nationals of the Union Association during the league's only season in . The ballpark had a seating capacity of 6,000, and was where the Russell Senate Office Building stands today. 

The ball field was bounded by C Street NE (north); Delaware Avenue NE (west): B Street (now Constitution Avenue) NE (south); and First Street NE (east); just northeast of the Capitol building.

After dropping out of the Union Association, the club joined the minor Eastern League for the 1885 season. The club regrouped as a new entry to the National League in 1886, and moved a few blocks north to the larger Capitol Park (II).

References
Smith, Curt. 2003. Storied Stadiums. Carroll & Graf Publishers. .

Baseball venues in Washington, D.C.
Defunct baseball venues in the United States
Defunct sports venues in Washington, D.C.